Thomas Chalkley Coffin (October 25, 1887 – June 8, 1934) was a congressman from Idaho, a Democrat in the U.S. House from 1933 to 1934.

Born in Caldwell, Idaho Territory, Coffin moved with his family to nearby Boise in 1898. He attended Boise High School and then transferred back east to Phillips Exeter Academy in New Hampshire. Coffin then entered Yale University's Sheffield Scientific School, where he was a member of St. Anthony Hall, and was graduated from the law department of Yale University in 1910. He was admitted to the bar in 1911 and was a deputy county attorney for Ada County in Boise and in 1913 became an assistant attorney general of Idaho. Coffin relocated east across the state to Pocatello in December 1915 and went into private practice. He served in the U.S. Navy in World War I as a Petty officer, second class in the aviation division.

Coffin was elected mayor of Pocatello in 1931 and ran for Congress in the 2nd district in 1932. In the Democratic landslide, he easily defeated the ten-term Republican incumbent, Addison T. Smith.

Source:

Only fifteen months into his first term, Coffin was struck by an automobile on a driveway in the south grounds of the U.S. Capitol on June 4, 1934, and suffered a fractured skull. He died four days later at Providence Hospital in Washington, D.C., and was buried on June 14 in Pocatello.

See also
 List of United States Congress members who died in office (1900–49)

References

External links
 
 The Political Graveyard – Thomas C. Coffin
 

1887 births
1934 deaths
People from Caldwell, Idaho
Episcopalians from Idaho
Democratic Party members of the United States House of Representatives from Idaho
Mayors of places in Idaho
People from Pocatello, Idaho
20th-century American politicians
20th-century American Episcopalians
Phillips Exeter Academy alumni
Yale Law School alumni
United States Navy sailors
Military personnel from Idaho
United States Navy personnel of World War I
Pedestrian road incident deaths
Road incident deaths in Washington, D.C.